The Honda 650 cc standard and sport motorcycles are a range of  inline-four standard and sport motorcycles made by Honda since 2013. The line includes the CB650F standard or 'naked bike', and the CBR650F sport bike that replaced outgoing CB600F Hornet.

The motorcycles have a new twin-spar steel chassis and a new inline-4 engine with a longer stroke increasing the displacement to 650 cc. ABS is optional, and a variant with ABS standard and restricted air intakes reduces the power below the  limit for the European A2 licence. They have four-into-one side-swept exhaust headers with a stubby exhaust muffler, which Honda claims improve mass centralisation. Honda made significant technical and cosmetic updates in 2017.

In November 2018, at EICMA, Honda announced the CB650R naked bike with their Neo Sports Café styling previously introduced on the CB1000R and CB300R, and the CBR650R sport bike with new Fireblade-style fairing.  Both motorcycles also received significant chassis and engine updates.

Model history

2014 "CB650F/CBR650F" (RC74)

Successor to the Hornet Honda CBR600F and Honda CBR600F, The All-new 650 class come with the standard "naked" version the CB650F, and the full fairing sport version the CBR650F . Base on the style of the 600F, this model still get a single triangle front lamp, hi clip-on, and the one piece's seat. offering in Red and matte Black color, which some market get the iconic Honda Tri-color schem.

2016 "CB650F/CBR650F" (RC74) 
Livery update with red frame and white frame.

2017 "CB650F/CBR650F" (RC96) 
Honda has freshen up the mid-life by the new color schem and the Euro 4 emissions regulation , the crankcase color has change from black to bronze color, LED headlights, updated air intake flow path, smaller two-chamber exhaust muffler, lowered gear ratios, Showa Dual Bending Valve (SDBV) front suspension, ABS standard.

2019 "CB650R/CBR650R" (RH01)
The model change for the 650's which the CB650R naked bike get Neo Sports Café styling line up with the cb150r cb300r cb1000r. The CBR650R sport bike also get the Fireblade style fairing and dual front lamps; rigid lighter frame, updated frame geometry, inverted Showa separate function front fork (SFF), the clip-on fork has moved to a lower position under the upper triple clamp, lighter cast Y-spoke aluminium wheels that is look the same to the Fireblade, radial mounted front brake calipers pair with the 320mm drilled disk, ABS standard, updated air intake with dual ram air under the front lamp and larger exhaust pipe & muffler, closer ratio gearing, flatter torque, higher red-line, assist slipper clutch, Honda Selectable Torque Control (HSTC) (working with ABS sensor), full LED lighting, integrated LCD dashboard, gear indicator, shift light, Quick Shifter(shift up) System (Optional), rear seat crowl (Optional).

2021 "CB650R/CBR650R" (RH03) 
With Euro 5 emissions regulation Honda has Camshaft and engine mapping revise, Minor styling updates including the LCD dashboard angle and illumination, Showa SFF-BP (separate function front fork big piston), new tail section fairing and license plate holder, new crankcase cover (still bronze color), revised cycle geometry and ergonomics.

Specifications
All specifications are manufacturer claimed unless otherwise specified.

References 

CBR650R
Sport bikes
Motorcycles introduced in 2018